San Tirso de Abres (Eonavian: Santiso d'Abres) is a municipality in the Autonomous Community of the Principality of Asturias, Spain. It is bordered on the north, south, and west by Lugo province of Galicia, and on the east by the municipalities of Taramundi and Vegadeo. It is the westernmost council in Asturias.

The municipality consists of only one parish, San Salvador. It is one of Eonavian speaking councils of Asturias

External links
Federación Asturiana de Concejos 
Guia del Occidente. San Tirso de Abres

References

Municipalities in Asturias